Vertical Entertainment is an American film distribution and production company.

Released

2010s

2020s

Upcoming

References

 
Vertical Entertainment